Sarikol, Sariqol, or Sarykol may refer to:

 Sarikol Range, a mountain range on the border with Tajikistan and China
 Tashkurgan, a town in Xinjiang, China that historically was also known as Sarikol
 Sarikol kingdom, a historical kingdom of the Pamir Mountains, mentioned in Chinese records, whose capital was at Tashkurgan
 Sarikoli language, a Pamir language
 Tajiks of Xinjiang, who are also known as Sarikolis
 Sarykol District, is a district of Kostanay Province in northern Kazakhstan
 Sarykol, Kostanay Province, an urban-type settlement in Kostanay Province, Kazakhstan
 Zorkul, a lake in the Pamir Mountains formerly known as Lake Sarikol